Hajrudin Ćatić (born 23 March 1975) is a Bosnian-German former professional footballer who plays as a midfielder for SV 1926 Rheidt.

References

External links
 

1975 births
Living people
Footballers from Cologne
German people of Bosnia and Herzegovina descent
Association football midfielders
Bosnia and Herzegovina footballers
SC Fortuna Köln players
SV Waldhof Mannheim players
Rot-Weiß Oberhausen players
1. FC Union Berlin players
SV Wehen Wiesbaden players
2. Bundesliga players
Regionalliga players
Landesliga players